The Council Tax (New Valuation Lists for England) Act 2006 (c 7) is an Act of the Parliament of the United Kingdom. One of its purposes was to postpone the compilation, in relation to billing authorities in England, of new valuation lists for the purposes of council tax until after the Lyons Inquiry had produced its final report, in order to allow that report to be taken into consideration when compiling those lists.

Section 1 - Dates on which new valuation lists must be compiled for England
This section amends sections 22B and 113 of the Local Government Finance Act 1992 and repeals paragraph 52(4) of Schedule 7 to the Local Government Act 2003.

References
Halsbury's Statutes,

External links
The Council Tax (New Valuation Lists for England) Act 2006, as amended from the National Archives.
The Council Tax (New Valuation Lists for England) Act 2006, as originally enacted from the National Archives.
Explanatory notes to the Council Tax (New Valuation Lists for England) Act 2006.

United Kingdom Acts of Parliament 2006
Acts of the Parliament of the United Kingdom concerning England
2006 in England
Taxation in England
Tax legislation in the United Kingdom